Dorbod may refer to:

Dörbet, a tribe of the Oirat people
Dorbod Mongol Autonomous County, in Heilongjiang, China
Dorbod Banner, a banner (county equivalent) in the Ulanqab region of Inner Mongolia, China